Guilt is a 1931 British romance film directed by Reginald Fogwell and starring James Carew, Anne Grey, Harold Huth and James Fenton. In the film, the wife of a playwright has an affair with an actor.

It was shot at Isleworth Studios as a quota quickie for release by Paramount Pictures.

Cast
 James Carew as James Barrett
 Anne Grey as Anne Barrett
 Harold Huth as Tony Carleton
 James Fenton as Roy
 Rex Curtis as Jack
 Anne Smiley as  Phyllis
 Ernest Lester as Jennings

References

Bibliography
 Chibnall, Steve. Quota Quickies: The Birth of the British 'B' Film. British Film Institute, 2007.
 Low, Rachael. Filmmaking in 1930s Britain. George Allen & Unwin, 1985.
 Wood, Linda. British Films, 1927-1939. British Film Institute, 1986.

External links

1931 films
1930s romance films
Films directed by Reginald Fogwell
Quota quickies
Films shot at Isleworth Studios
British black-and-white films
British romance films
1930s English-language films
1930s British films
English-language romance films